Kamarajar Road is an arterial road in city of Coimbatore, Tamil Nadu, India. This road connects Singanallur and Hope College.It acts as a major link between Avinashi Road and Trichy Road,the two major arterial roads in Coimbatore city.

Alignment
The road is a two lane road from Hope College to Singanallur.

Bus terminals
The Singanallur Bus Terminus,one of the intercity bus terminals of Coimbatore city is located along the road.

Places transversed 
 Hope College
 Uppilipalayam
 Varadharajapuram
 Singanallur

Major Landmarks on Kamarajar Road 

Singanallur Bus Terminus
ESIC Medical College

Major Hotels
O by Tamara
Hotel Park Avenue Suites
Fab Hotels Theejas

Cinemas 
Manis Theatre

Major Restaurants
Hotel Dindigul Thalapakkati
Hotel RHR
Renuga Cafe
Kovai Royal Biriyani
Biriyani Crush
Hotel Sooryas 
Shri Laxmi Narayana
Its Shawarma and Lazzi In
Hotel Dharun Chettinadu
Buhari Biriyani
Kovai Grill

Educational institutions 
ESIC Medical College
VIBGYOR School
Gandhi Cenetary Memorial School
KSG College of Arts and Science
JK College of Nursing and Pharmaceticals
Thiyagi NGR Matric.Hr.Sec.School

Shopping 
D Mart,Varadharajapuram
Robin's Hypermarket
Farm corner

Temple 
Sri Ulagalandha Perumal temple
Sri Varadharaja Perumal Temple
Mariyamman Temple
Mahalakshmi Temple

References 

Central business districts in India
Roads in Coimbatore